Henry Kulky (born Henry Kulakowich; August 11, 1911 – February 12, 1965) was an American actor and professional wrestler from Hastings-on-Hudson, New York, probably best remembered as Chief Petty Officer Curly Jones from season 1 of Voyage to the Bottom of the Sea.

Career
Kulky began boxing in his teenage years. After six bouts, he stopped boxing when he was offered a position training wrestlers at St. Matthew's Lyceum in his native Hastings-on-Hudson.

Stanislaus Zbyszko convinced Kulky to compete professionally in 1939. Moving to Argentina, Kulky competed throughout South America under the ring name Bomber Kulkavich. The number of matches in which he competed is uncertain; one claim states that he won 172 of 175 matches. Kulky, however, claims that he won nearly all of 7,000 matches. While in South America, he is also said to have won the continent's judo crown.

Like most wrestlers who turned to acting in the 1950s he owed his big break to Mike Mazurki. The two appeared in several parts in the 1940s and 1950s, with Mazurki's agent getting him a part in Call Northside 777.

Because of his tough guy image, Kulky became typecast as military men, thugs, gangsters, bartenders, wrestlers and other "strong guys" who were at times friendly and lovable. From 1953 to 1958, he played Otto Schmidlap in the television series The Life of Riley. In the series, Kulky portrayed a co-worker of series character Chester Riley, a wing riveter at an aircraft plant. In 1952 he appeared in an episode (#11) of Adventures of Superman, as a wrestler working for a crooked promoter. In 1954 he appeared in an episode (#141) of The Lone Ranger. From 1959 to 1962, Kulky was cast in the recurring role as Chief Max Bronsky in forty-six episodes of Jackie Cooper's CBS military sitcom-drama television series Hennesey. The role was close to Kulky's heart because during World War II, he was a boatswain's mate in the United States Navy.

Kulky's last role was as Chief Curley Jones in the television series Voyage to the Bottom of the Sea.

Death
Kulky died on February 12, 1965, in Oceanside, California, of a heart attack suffered while he was studying a script.

Selected filmography

References

External links
 
 "Henry Kulky as CPO Curly Jones" at vttbots.com
 "Henry Kulky Bio" from Voyage to the Bottom of the Sea Syndication Package by FOX
 From the mat to the Bottom of the Sea at Slam Wrestling

1911 births
1965 deaths
People from Hastings-on-Hudson, New York
American male film actors
American male television actors
American male professional wrestlers
Male actors from New York (state)
Military personnel from New York (state)
20th-century American male actors
Boxers from New York (state)